Thomas J. Skelly was an American football coach.  Skelly was the fourth head football coach at Marquette University located in Milwaukee, Wisconsin and he held that position for the 1904 season. His coaching record at Marquette was 5–2.

Skelly, a native of Norwich, Connecticut, was a graduate of The College of the Holy Cross. There he played football, basketball and baseball, the latter with the position of right fielder, for three years. In the 1903 football season, he had also served as the team's captain.

Head coaching record

References

1879 births
Year of death missing
Baseball outfielders
Holy Cross Crusaders baseball players
Holy Cross Crusaders football players
Marquette Golden Avalanche football coaches
Sportspeople from Norwich, Connecticut
Players of American football from Connecticut
Baseball players from Connecticut